Vesa Rosendahl (born 5 December 1975) is a Finnish speed skater. He competed in the men's 1500 metres event at the 2002 Winter Olympics.

References

External links
 

1975 births
Living people
Finnish male speed skaters
Olympic speed skaters of Finland
Speed skaters at the 2002 Winter Olympics
People from Harjavalta
Sportspeople from Satakunta